Chris Hunter may refer to:

 Chris Hunter (actor) (born 1987), American actor
 Chris Hunter (basketball) (born 1984), basketball player
 Chris Hunter (chemist) (born 1965), British chemist and academic
 Chris Hunter (British Army officer), British soldier and author
 Chris Hunter (field hockey) (born 1972), Canadian hockey player
 Chris Hunter (Four Loko), founder of Four Loko
 Chris Hunter (musician), former saxophonist with Richard Niles

See also
 Chris Hunt (disambiguation)